Tawawa is an unincorporated community in northeastern Green Township, Shelby County, Ohio, United States.  It lies along State Route 29 less than one mile (about 1½ km) away from the Champaign County border.  Mosquito Creek, a tributary of the Great Miami River, flows northwestward along the southern edge of Tawawa.  The community lies 8 miles (12¾ km) southeast of the city of Sidney, the county seat of Shelby County.

History
Tawawa was originally called New Palestine, and under the latter name was laid out in 1832. A post office called Tawawa was established in 1848, and remained in operation until 1905. The name Tawawa was the Native American name for Mosquito Creek.

References

Unincorporated communities in Shelby County, Ohio
Unincorporated communities in Ohio